Lipotriches rubella, or red-tailed small-nomia, is a species of bee in the genus Lipotriches, of the family Halictidae. It is known to occur in Chad as well as western, eastern and southern Africa.

Description and biology

Members of this genus are important pollinators of plants, which the red-tailed small-nomia likely is as well.

References

Halictidae